Buzdartherium (meaning "Buzdar beast") is a dubious genus of extinct paraceratheriid from Oligocene and possibly also Miocene aged sediments from the Chitarwata Formation of Pakistan. The monotypic species is B. gulkirao, named in 2016, and its remains have been found only in the Sulaiman Basin (Chitarwata Formation), which preserves rocks dating from as early as the Cretaceous, although the Indian Plate did not collide into the Eurasian Plate until about 30 million years ago, during the Early Oligocene.

Discovery and naming 
The holotype of B. gulkirao is based on specimen MSM-1-Taunsa, which consists of a single tusk like incisor tooth, a premolar tooth, a cross-sectioned tooth, vertebrae, ribs, a spine, the proximal end of a humerus, an ulna, the proximal end of a pubis, a cross-sectioned pubis, the proximal end of an ischium, a cross sectioned ischium, a femur, a carpal, astragalus or tarsal, a metacarpal or metatarsal, phalanges, and an ungual. The holotype was found in Buzdar, Pakistan in Oligocene strata. The genus and species was named by Malkhani in 2016, and was described briefly again in 2017.

Description 
Buzdartherium would have been a large mammal with long bulky legs and a long neck, used to forage for plants that would have made up its diet.

Buzdartherium would have had a long, smooth forehead that lacked the attachment points for horns. The back of the skull was low and narrow, without the large lambdoid crests at the top and along the sagittal crest.

Buzdartherium shows Eurasian affinity and migrated from Eurasia to the Indian subcontinent or vice versa via the Western and Northern Indus Sutures, after drifting away from Gondwana during the Cretaceous and after the collision of the Indian subcontinent with Asia, which occurred during the early Ypresian epoch of the Eocene period, around 55 million years ago.

Classification
Upon naming, Buzdartherium was placed within the Indricotheriinae by Malkhani (2016). However, Paraceratheriidae is now considered to be a separate family. The cladogram below follows the 1989 analysis of Indricotheriinae by Lucas and Sobus, and shows the closest relatives of Buzdartherium, which was added at a later date:

References

Oligocene rhinoceroses
Fossil taxa described in 2016
Prehistoric rhinoceroses
Fossils of Pakistan